The 41st edition of the World Allround Speed Skating Championships for Women took place on 12 and 13 February in Hamar at the Hamar ice rink.

Title holder was Beth Heiden from the USA.

Distance medalists

Classification

 * = Fall

Source:

References

Attribution
In Dutch

1980s in speed skating
1980s in women's speed skating
1980 World Allround
1980 in women's speed skating